Brutus is a short film directed by Konstantin Fam of 2015, the second novel of the film trilogy "Witnesses" and the sequel of the "Shoes", dedicated to the memory of Holocaust victims.

Plot 
“Brutus” continues the concept of "Witnesses" trilogy and tells us story of the Holocaust through the eyes of a German Shepherd dog Brutus. The Nuremberg Laws have separated the dog with his favorite mistress, Jewish woman. In the process of training and taming Brutus becomes a concentration camp beast-killer. The film is based on a novel of a Czech writer Ludvik Ashkenazy.

Crew 
 Director: Konstantin Fam 
 Composer: Egor Romanenko
 Producers: Konstantin Fam, Ian Fisher Romanovsky, Alexey A. Petruhin, Yuri Igrusha, Egor Odintsov
 Script: Konstantin Fam 
 Cinematography: Giora Bejach

Cast 
 Oksana Fandera- Rosanna
 Filipp Yankovsky - Horst 
 Vladimir Koshevoi  - Leo
 Anna Churina - Clara
 Maria Zykova   - Ada
 Marta Drozdova - Martha

Production 
Filmmakers from Russia, Romania, Israel, the United States, Moldova, Belarus and the Czech Republic participated in the production.

The film was created with the financial support of the Ministry for Culture of Russia, as well as private philanthropists.

Art features 
The crew used a variety of filming techniques. The main aim was to show the events through the dog's eyes.

Konstantin Fam:

 -Our film will be tough, but entirely pacifist in nature. My task is to make the viewer see things from the dog’s point of view, to show how quickly somebody can be brainwashed and turn into a monster

Confession 
Film premiered at the Moscow International Film Festival in June 2016.

Accolades

Awards
 The Nevada International Film Festival (USA), Experimental Film Competition, Platinum Reel Award Winner (2016)
 Sochi International Film Awards (Russia), Special Prize  (2016)
 Film was longlisted to the 89th Academy Awards by Academy Award for Live Action Short Film (USA)
 The Golden Eagle Award of National Academy of Motion Pictures Arts and Sciences of Russia (Russia)
 Best Shorts Competition - "Best Jewish film"  (USA)

Participations
 Hong Kong World International Film Festival (Hong Kong)
 International Filmmaker Festival of World Cinema London (UK)
 Sedona Film Festival (USA)
 PUFF Film Festival Hong Kong 
 Best Shorts Competition (USA)
 New Haven International Film Festival (USA)

Official partners 
 Federation of Jewish Communities of Russia
 Documentary Film Center 
 Youth Center of the Union of Cinematographers of the Russian Federation
 ROSKINO

See also 
 Witnesses (2018 film)
 Shoes (2012 film) 
 Violin (2017 film)

References

External links
 
 

Holocaust films
2016 films
2016 war drama films
Russian war drama films
2010s Russian-language films
War epic films
Epic films based on actual events
Rescue of Jews during the Holocaust
Films shot in Romania
Russian epic films
2016 drama films
Russian World War II films
American World War II films
2010s American films